From A Room: Volume 2 is the third studio album by American singer-songwriter Chris Stapleton, released on December 1, 2017, through Mercury Nashville. Produced by Dave Cobb and Stapleton, the album comprises a range of music styles, including country, Southern rock and Southern soul. Commercially, it debuted at number two on the US Billboard 200. It received a nomination for Best Country Album at the 61st Annual Grammy Awards, with the single "Millionaire" being nominated for Best Country Solo Performance.

Background
Stapleton released From A Room: Volume 1 in May 2017, and confirmed the release of Volume 2 for later that year. Like its predecessor, the album takes its name from Nashville's RCA Studio A, where the recording sessions took place. The album tracks "Tryin' to Untangle My Mind", "Hard Livin'" and "Midnight Train to Memphis" have been featured in his All-American Road Show Tour prior to the release. The latter song was previously recorded by his former band The SteelDrivers. The album opens with a cover of Kevin Welch's "Millionaire", and closes with a cover of Homer Banks and Lester Snell's "Friendship," previously recorded by Pops Staples. The tracks "Millionaire", "Scarecrow in the Garden" and "Tryin' to Untangle My Mind" were released as a promotional singles with the album preorder on October 20, November 4 and 17, respectively.

Music and themes

A Kentucky.com music journalist stated traditional country and Southern soul "play into the record equally." For a Rolling Stone reviewer the Americana album comprises country, folk, blues, Southern rock and soul. The opening track "Millionaire" is a mid-tempo soul-influenced heartland rock ballad driven by acoustic guitar, lyrically about "spare love" and appreciating relationship closeness over material wealth, with his wife and music collaborator Morgane on background vocals. The Southern rock track "Hard Livin'" comprises phase-shifted guitar riff, with a Rolling Stone writer comparing it to Travellers "Nobody to Blame".

Featuring Celtic-sounding verses, the ballad "Scarecrow in the Garden" tells the story of an heir of a West Virginia farm, who laments bad times not allowing him to enjoy the same prosperity of his ancestors, an immigrant family from Northern Ireland. The narrator in the bluesy rock and traditional country song "Tryin' to Untangle My Mind" confesses his past habits of drinking whiskey, dating women and spending all his little money. "Nobody's Lonely Tonight" is a slow soul ballad about looking for some comfort after giving up on love. "A Simple Song" was written with Darrell Hayes, Stapleton's father-in-law, where the narrator is heartened by his family's presence while dealing with quotidian struggle. Lyrically, "Midnight Train to Memphis" is about a person that gets to listen to the train's rumbling sound every day of his time in prison. Delivered alone, "Drunkard's Prayer" finds the singer playing the part of a broken, lonely man who wants to change and seeks for forgiveness. The cover of the song "Friendship" is a country soul track, that differs from the original for its R&B influences, "deeper" groves and guitar tremolo.

Critical reception

From A Room: Volume 2 received generally positive reviews from music critics. At Metacritic, which assigns a normalized rating out of 100 to reviews from mainstream critics, the album has an average score of 80 out of 100, which indicates "generally favorable reviews" based on nine reviews.

Writing for NPR, Jewly Hight noted Stapleton "chose several songs that dwell on, even savor, meaningful attachments", listing as examples "Millionaire", "A Simple Song", "Friendship" and "Scarecrow in the Garden". Compared to Volume 1, Hight opined that its emotional center "lies elsewhere." She concluded saying "folding these songs into his repertoire lends greater emotional weight to his entire body of work. Wise and sensitive storyteller that he is, he knows that deprivation and loss are felt the most deeply when it's clear what's at stake." Robert Crawford of Rolling Stone described it as "lean and live-sounding" while "Stapleton's voice remains as titanic ever, but on these nine tracks, he packs an equally sized punch as both picker and bandleader." Also from the music magazine, Will Hermes compared it to Volume 1 and opined, "the band's the same but leaner, stripped to guitars, bass, drums and Stapleton's mighty voice, with harmonies by his wife, Morgane, smartly moved up in the mix. Again, the songs feel like unearthed classics."

Reviewers from The A.V. Club opined "Stapleton's gravelly vocals sell his own openly emotive songs like no one else could," adding that he "runs the gamut of emotions and genres, traveling from the hard-rocking rumination on the difficulties of "Hard Livin'" to the minimalist blues of "Nobody's Lonely Tonight." Writing for Variety, Chris Willman called it the second-best country album of the year, only behind Stapleton's own Volume 1. Terence Cawley in The Boston Globe said the songs were "expertly crafted." Mike Davies in Folk Radio UK called "Scarecrow In The Garden" the best song in the album, followed by "Drunkard’s Prayer". Stephen M. Deusner from Pitchfork noted Volume 2 "leavens its heavier moments with songs that celebrate the simple joys of love and marriage and family, without lapsing into sentimentality." For Kentucky.com, Walter Tunis summarized his review writing "Stapleton's vivid, unvarnished musical portraits are already striking in ways that distinguish him from pretty much any of his country contemporaries." Stephen Thomas Erlewine of AllMusic said it is "a collection of moments, just like Vol. 1, but that's the charm of Vol. 2," and opined that without "crafting a major statement" the songs "work on their own terms."

Accolades

*Along with From A Room: Volume 1

Commercial performance
From A Room: Volume 2 debuted at number two on the US Billboard 200 with 125,000 album-equivalent units, of which 116,000 were in pure album sales. With Volume 1, which also opened at number 2, Stapleton is the first country act to score two top-two charting albums in a calendar year on the Billboard 200 since Luke Bryan in 2013. On the charts dated February 10, 2018, Traveller, From A Room: Volume 1, and Volume 2 held the top-three spots on Top Country Albums, making Stapleton the third artist ever to do so, the others being Garth Brooks in 1992 and Charlie Rich in 1974. It was certified Gold by the Gold in the US on June 8, 2017, and Platinum on April 26, 2018. It has sold 541,200 copies domestically as of April 2019.

Awards

Track listing
Track listing adapted from the iTunes Store.

All tracks are produced by Dave Cobb and Chris Stapleton.

Personnel
Credits for From A Room: Volume 2 adapted from AllMusic.

Musicians
 Dave Cobb - acoustic guitar, percussion
 J.T. Cure – bass guitar, upright bass
 Derek Mixon – drums
 Chris Stapleton – acoustic guitar, electric guitar, lead vocals
 Morgane Stapleton – background vocals, tambourine

Technical personnel
 Dave Cobb – producer
 Mary Hooper – design
 Gena Jonhson – assistant
 Pete Lyman – mastering
 Vance Powell – engineer, mixing
 Chris Stapleton – producer
 Rachel Urquhart – illustrations

Charts

Weekly charts

Year-end charts

Certifications

Release history

References

External links

2017 albums
Albums produced by Dave Cobb
Chris Stapleton albums
Mercury Nashville albums
Americana albums
Southern soul albums
Southern rock albums